Immortal is the third studio album by the Danish power metal band Pyramaze, released on 30 May 2008.

Iced Earth vocalist Matt Barlow, who had originally left Iced Earth and later joined Pyramaze, performs the vocals on Immortal; however, on the official Pyramaze website, both Barlow and Pyramaze guitarist Michael Kammeyer have stated that this album will be Barlow's only contribution to Pyramaze, after which he will continue to work only with Iced Earth.

Track listing

Personnel 
 Matt Barlow − vocals
 Michael Kammeyer − guitars
 Morten Gade Sørensen − drums
 Jonah Weingarten − keyboards
 Niels Kvist − bass
 Toke Skjønnemand − guitars

References

External links 
 Pyramaze homepage
 Pyramaze Myspace

Pyramaze albums
2008 albums